Louis Benedict Kucera (August 24, 1888 – May 9, 1957) was an American prelate of the Roman Catholic Church. He served as bishop of the Diocese of Lincoln in Nebraska from 1930 until his death.

Biography

Early life 
Louis Kucera was born in Wheatland, Minnesota, to John Wenceslaus and Mary (née Skluzacek) Kucera, who were Bohemian immigrants. He attended St. John's College before studying at the College of St. Thomas, both in St. Paul. After his graduation in 1909, he was offered admission to the West Point Military Academy. However, Kucera declined, choosing instead to study for the priesthood. He then entered St. Paul Seminary in St. Paul.

Priesthood 
Kucera was ordained to the priesthood for the Archdiocese of Dubuque on June 8, 1915, by Archbishop John Ireland. He then served as a curate at St. Patrick's Parish in Tama, Iowa, until 1916, when he became professor of Latin and prefect of discipline at Columbia College in Dubuque. In 1925, Kucera was named pastor of Holy Trinity Parish in Protivin, Iowa.

Bishop of Lincoln 
On June 30, 1930, Kucera was appointed the fifth Bishop of the Diocese of Lincoln by Pope Pius XI. He received his episcopal consecration on October 28, 1930, from Archbishop Francis Beckman, with Bishops Thomas Drumm and Henry Rohlman serving as co-consecrators. He was named an assistant at the pontifical throne and in 1955 a count of the apostolic palace.

Kucera died on May 9, 1957, at age 68.

References

1888 births
1957 deaths
People from Rice County, Minnesota
Roman Catholic Archdiocese of Dubuque
20th-century Roman Catholic bishops in the United States
University of St. Thomas (Minnesota) alumni
Roman Catholic bishops of Lincoln
Catholics from Minnesota
Loras College faculty
American people of Bohemian descent